Esparron may refer to the following places in France:

 Esparron, Hautes-Alpes, a commune in the department of Hautes-Alpes
 Esparron, Haute-Garonne, a commune in the department of Haute-Garonn
 Esparron, Var, a commune in the department of Var